Oldbury and Halesowen was a parliamentary constituency in the West Midlands, which returned one Member of Parliament (MP)  to the House of Commons of the Parliament of the United Kingdom from 1950 until it was abolished for the February 1974 general election.

It was created from the eastern section of the Stourbridge constituency, which was reduced substantially in size, as a result of the recent population growth in both Oldbury and Halesowen.

It was then partly replaced by the new Halesowen and Stourbridge constituency, with the Oldbury area becoming part of Warley West.

Boundaries 
The Boroughs of Halesowen and Oldbury.

Members of Parliament

Elections

Elections in the 1950s

Elections in the 1960s

Elections in the 1970s

References 

Parliamentary constituencies in the West Midlands (county) (historic)
Constituencies of the Parliament of the United Kingdom established in 1950
Constituencies of the Parliament of the United Kingdom disestablished in 1974
Oldbury, West Midlands